Amy  Kurzweil (born October 23, 1986) is an American cartoonist and writer. In 2016, she published the graphic memoir Flying Couch. She writes cartoons for The New Yorker.

Life and career

Kurzweil was born in Boston in 1986. Her mother, Sonya, is a psychotherapist, and her father is the futurist and inventor Ray Kurzweil. She graduated from Stanford University in 2009 and earned a master's degree in creative writing from the New School in New York City in 2013. She had multiple teaching jobs in the city, including dance at public schools and English at the Fashion Institute of Technology. She aspired to a career in fiction writing, but in her twenties found "how much I loved to draw". An early cartooning influence was the work of Alison Bechdel.

A graphic novel-cum-memoir by Kurzweil, Flying Couch, was published in 2016. Inspired by graphic novels such as Bechdel's Fun Home, Art Spiegelman's Maus, and Marjane Satrapi's Persepolis, it tells the family history of her bubbe (grandmother) as a Holocaust survivor, her mother as a psychologist, and herself as a young woman. The project began as Kurzweil's (non-cartoon) senior thesis at Stanford, and she continued to research, write, and eventually illustrate it over eight years. Kurzweil drew significantly from an archive at the University of Michigan–Dearborn of oral histories of Holocaust survivors, including an interview with her grandmother. Reviews of the book were largely positive.

Kurzweil's cartoons regularly appear in The New Yorker and other outlets. An upcoming book, Artificial: A Love Story, will follow the life of her father and her grandfather, another survivor of the Holocaust.

Bibliography

References

External links

Living people
1986 births
Writers from Boston
American women cartoonists
21st-century American women writers
American Jews from Massachusetts
Stanford University alumni
The New School alumni
The New Yorker cartoonists